

Local

American League

National League

Former teams

See also
List of current Major League Baseball broadcasters
The Baseball Network announcers
Owned-and-operated television stations in the United States

1ABC owned television station.

2CBS owned television station.

3Fox owned television station.

4NBC owned television station.

5Superstation (bold indicates former superstation).

National

Superstations

Postseason coverage
When the League Championship Series was first instituted in 1969, the Major League Baseball television contract at the time allowed a local TV station in the market of each competing team to also carry the LCS games. So, for example, Mets fans in New York could choose to watch either the NBC telecast or Lindsey Nelson, Bob Murphy and Ralph Kiner on WOR-TV.

1983 marked the last time that local telecasts of League Championship Series games were allowed. In 1982, Major League Baseball recognized a problem with this due to the emergence of cable superstations such as WTBS in Atlanta and WGN-TV in Chicago. When TBS tried to petition for the right to do a "local" Braves broadcast of the 1982 NLCS, Major League Baseball got a Philadelphia federal court to ban them on the grounds that as a cable superstation, TBS could not have a nationwide telecast competing with ABC's.

Since 2007, MLB playoff games on TBS are not made available to local over-the-air broadcasters in the participating teams' markets. Under the previous contract, ESPN was required to make those games available on the air in local markets.

See also
Historical NBA over-the-air television broadcasters
Historical NHL over-the-air television broadcasters

References

External links
MLB Over The Air Affiliates
BaseballChronology.com!
MLB LOCAL FLAGSHIPS AND ANNOUNCERS

ABC Sports
CBS Sports
Fox Sports original programming
Major League Baseball on NBC
Over-the-air television broadcasters
Over-the-air-television broadcasters
Over-the-air television broadcasters
Local sports television programming in the United States